North Dakota Highway 11 (ND 11) is a  east–west state highway in the U.S. state of North Dakota. ND 11's western terminus is at U.S. Route 83 (US 83) west of Hague, and the eastern terminus is a continuation as Minnesota State Highway 55 (MN 55) at the Minnesota/ North Dakota border.

Route description

Major intersections

See also

 List of state highways in North Dakota
 List of highways numbered 11

References

External links

011
Transportation in Dickey County, North Dakota
Transportation in McIntosh County, North Dakota
Transportation in Emmons County, North Dakota
Transportation in Sargent County, North Dakota
Transportation in Richland County, North Dakota